Maculonaclia matsabory is a moth of the subfamily Arctiinae. It was described by Paul Griveaud in 1967. It is found on Madagascar.

References

 

Arctiinae
Moths described in 1967